Taru Kivinen is a Finnish curler.

Teams

References

External links

Living people
Finnish female curlers
Year of birth missing (living people)
Place of birth missing (living people)